Funky Fresh Few are a hip-hop act from Blackpool, Lancashire, England, who started out as a graffiti crew called Imperial Arts. The band originally consisted of James Folks, Damon Savage and Timeone.

They met up with Mark Rae in 1996, who was setting up the independent record label Grand Central Records and released their debut EP, Slow for Focus.

They released another 12", "Through These Veins", which featured Jeru the Damaja's friend Afu-Ra.

In 2000, Glenn Reynolds, formerly known as OSC, joined the group. They released their debut album in 2002, which featured guest MCs including Craig G, Jimmy Grand and Dirk Diggla from the U.S., and Wig and Sage from the UK.

Funky Fresh Few also mixed the second disc on the 2005 Grand Central Records compilation, Underground Crown Holders.

Discography
 Stealing (May 2003)

English hip hop groups
Musical groups from Lancashire